Nicholas Michael Forster (born 8 September 1973) is an English former professional footballer who was most recently the manager of Staines Town. Forster has also been player-manager at Brentford and manager of Dover Athletic.

Career

Early years 
Forster, who was born in Caterham, Surrey, was spotted playing for non-league Horley Town and invited for trials by Gillingham in December 1991. After impressing with the youth and reserve teams he signed a professional contract in May 1992, making his debut the following September. He starred for the club during the otherwise disappointing 1993–94 season, scoring 18 goals, but at the end of the season he turned down a new contract and instead joined Brentford for £320,000, a move which provoked bad feeling from Gillingham fans which persisted for many years.

Brentford and Birmingham City 
While at Brentford, Forster formed prolific partnerships with Carl Asaba and Robert Taylor, both of whom would later join his former club Gillingham. He made 109 league appearances for Brentford and scored 39 goals during his time at Griffin Park. He was later capped by England at under-21 level soon afterwards. In January 1997, Forster moved to Birmingham City for a fee of £700,000. He made 67 league appearances and scored eleven league goals for the club.

Reading 
Two years later he was on the move again, this time to Reading, where he spent six years at the club at a cost of £650,000 between 1999 and 2005. Forster receives part of the credit for salvaging Reading's 1999–2000 season, during which the club rose from Division Two's relegation zone at Christmas to a finish in the top ten under caretaker manager Alan Pardew. However, an injured Forster was unable to contribute to the club's good fortune the following season. However, he did return in time for the 2000–01 Division Two play-off semi final against Wigan Athletic. In the second leg with Wigan leading 1–0 on aggregate, Forster came on as a late substitute. He set up Martin Butler for the equaliser before winning a penalty; after Jamie Cureton's effort was saved, Forster scored from the rebound. Reading were to lose the final 3–2 after extra time to Walsall. He then scored 18 goals the following season as Reading were promoted to Division One.

Forster regards Reading's 2002–03 campaign as his best period of form during his career, when he notched 17 goals, including hattricks against Ipswich Town and Preston North End as Reading finished in fourth place. He scored the opening goal in the play-off semi final against Wolverhampton Wanderers, but went off injured and Reading lost 3–1 on aggregate.

Forster considers the club as "home".

Ipswich Town 
Despite being a popular player at Reading, he was allowed to join Ipswich Town on a free transfer in 2005. Unable to replicate for Ipswich the form he showed with Reading due to several injury setbacks over the 2005–06 season, Forster signed a two-year contract with Hull City on 31 August 2006 for a £250,000 transfer fee. He had been a teammate of Hull City's manager, Phil Parkinson, while at Reading.

Hull City 
During his time at Hull City, Forster made 37 appearances and scored six goals for the club; these totals include one goal in two FA Cup appearances. His form helped propel him to second place in the club's Player of the Year awards for the 2006–07 season.

Brighton & Hove Albion 
In January 2007, Brighton & Hove Albion made an unsuccessful £100,000 bid for Forster. However, at the end of the 2006–07 season, Forster stated his wish to move back to the south of England for family reasons, and eventually signed a three-year contract with Brighton in late June 2007 for a £75,000 fee. He attributed his decision to drop down to Football League One from the Championship to the ambition shown by Brighton manager Dean Wilkins and chairman Dick Knight.

Forster was appointed club captain after the departure of Dean Hammond during January 2008, and confirmed in the role by new manager Micky Adams for the 2008–09 season. He won the League One Player of The Month award for September 2009 after scoring five goals in four League games. Having lost his first-team place after a contract dispute with manager Gus Poyet, Forster left Brighton for Charlton Athletic on 25 March 2010 on loan until the end of the season. At the conclusion of the season, Forster's contract at Brighton expired and he left the club.

Brentford (second spell) 
On 16 June 2010, Forster re-signed for Brentford on a two-year deal. He scored his first goal in his second spell at the club in a 1–1 draw with Exeter City on 14 January 2011. Forster was appointed as temporary manager following the departure of Andy Scott on 3 February 2011, with Mark Warburton as his assistant. On 1 March, it was confirmed Forster would remain first team manager on a permanent basis until the end of the current season. On 19 May 2011, Forster announced his retirement from football to concentrate on management. Earlier that week, it was announced that he had failed to land the Brentford manager's job.

Lingfield 
In 2011, Forster signed for Lingfield of the Sussex County League. He scored twice on his debut in an FA Cup match against Hailsham Town. His first league goals came in his next game for the club in a 3–0 win against AFC Uckfield.

Dover Athletic 
On 27 September 2011, he was appointed player-manager of Dover Athletic after the departure of Martin Hayes. He appeared on the substitutes' bench in the first league match of the season, a 2–2 home draw with Farnborough on 18 August 2012. Forster made his Dover debut as a 46th-minute substitute for Calum Willock in a 1–0 home loss to Chelmsford City on 4 September.

In January 2013, with Dover still third in the table despite five losses in a row, Forster was placed on gardening leave; the club appointed a new manager the following day.

Staines Town 
Forster was appointed as the replacement for Marcus Gayle as manager of Staines Town on 8 January 2015, with the task of keeping them in the Conference South. However, Staines Town were relegated to the Isthmian League Premier Division at the end of the 2014–15 season.

Personal life 
As of 2020, Forster ran The Spot Wellness Centre in Godstone.  His stepson, Jake Forster-Caskey, is also a footballer.

Career statistics

Club

Managerial statistics

Honours 
Brentford
Football League Second Division runner-up: 1994–95

Reading
Football League Second Division runner-up: 2001–02

Individual
PFA Team of the Year: 1994–95 Second Division, 2001–02 Second Division
Football League One Player of the Month: September 2009

References

External links 
 Nicky Forster player profile at seagulls.co.uk
 Nicky Forster player profile at hullcityafc.net
 Nicky Forster player profile at readingfc.co.uk
 Nicky Forster player profile at margatefootballclubhistory.com
 
 

1973 births
People from Caterham
Living people
English footballers
England under-21 international footballers
Association football forwards
Horley Town F.C. players
Gillingham F.C. players
Margate F.C. players
Hythe Town F.C. players
Brentford F.C. players
Birmingham City F.C. players
Reading F.C. players
Ipswich Town F.C. players
Hull City A.F.C. players
Brighton & Hove Albion F.C. players
Charlton Athletic F.C. players
Lingfield F.C. players
Dover Athletic F.C. players
English Football League players
English football managers
Brentford F.C. managers
Dover Athletic F.C. managers
English Football League managers
National League (English football) managers